The U of L Sports Network is the radio network of the University of Louisville Cardinals. It consists of fifteen (15) radio stations in primarily located in Kentucky, but the network serves much of Kentucky and southern Indiana.

On-air personalities
Paul Rogers (Play-by-play commentator (men's basketball and Louisville Cardinals football)) 
Bob Valvano (Color analyst (men's basketball))
Doug Ormay (Color analyst, alternate (men's basketball)/Sideline reporter (football))
Craig Swabek (Color analyst,(football))
Jim Kelch (Play-by-play commentator (Women's basketball) 
Adrienne Johnson (Color analyst (women's basketball))

Affiliates

Immediate Louisville area

Kentucky (outside the Louisville area)

Southwest Ohio

USA Nationwide
U of L Sports Network broadcasts can also be heard via Sirius XM Radio.

See also
UK Sports Network—radio network of the Kentucky Wildcats 
Hilltopper IMG Sports Network—radio network of the Western Kentucky Hilltoppers
Vol Network—radio network of the Tennessee Volunteers

References

External links
University of Louisville athletics

 

Louisville Cardinals
Radio stations in Kentucky
College football on the radio
Sports radio networks in the United States